Groveton is a census-designated place (CDP) and the primary village in the town of Northumberland in Coos County, New Hampshire, United States. The population was 1,068 at the 2020 census. It is located at the intersection of U.S. Route 3 and New Hampshire Route 110.

The paper mill, which was the primary employer in Groveton, was closed by Wausau Paper in 2008.

Groveton is part of the Berlin, NH–VT Micropolitan Statistical Area.

History

Fort Wentworth
Fort Wentworth was a colonial fort built in 1755 at the junction of the Upper Ammonoosuc River and Connecticut River, in Northumberland, New Hampshire, just downstream from the present site of Groveton.

Paper mill
Diamond International Papers was originally the hub of Groveton. Diamond International was replaced by James River Paper Company, which was followed by Wausau Paper. In 2008 Wausau ceased production in its Groveton mill, which in turn precluded the trains from stopping in Groveton any more. There were plans to turn the mill into a biomass plant, but as of January 2012, plans for buying the mill had fallen through. After an interview with former mill employees, the town of Northumberland decided to demolish the mill for scrap metals. With the price of metals at an all-time high, the town would make more money with the metals than waiting for the mill to sell. Plans for the future site included an LNG plant, which would have brought 80 or so jobs to the North Country. However, the planned development did not materialize.

Hyrdogen power plant
Q Hydrogen, in conjunction with state and local political and development officials, is a developer of hydrogen production technology that is economical at roughly room temperature. The feedstock is water.

Electricity production has begun at the site of the old paper mill, which has been scraped clean of most evidence that the  facility existed there. From the Concord Monitor:

"When the idea first surfaced a year ago there was talk of building a data center to use the electricity on-site, but that has fallen through. Partly as a result, the power plant has been scaled back from 29 megawatts to 7 megawatts, which has the advantage of sidestepping the lengthy approval process from the state Site Evaluation Committee."

Steam locomotive
A coal-powered steam locomotive was owned by the Odell Manufacturing Company paper mill for use as a switch engine. Having last seen use in the mid-1960s, it is presently maintained by Wausau Mills and Groveton Paper Board. The community beautification committee "dresses it up" every Christmas and keep it clean.

Riverside Speedway and Adventure Park
In 1964 Riverside Speedway, a 1/4 mile banked oval track, opened in Groveton. In late 2014 the speedway was purchased and underwent a name change. It was sold again in late 2019 and renamed Riverside Speedway and Adventure Park. In the coming years upgrades are planned for the facility to be a four-season event location, including ATV/UTV and other off-road events as well as snow machine racing. It features weekly racing series and is a popular venue in local auto racing.

The Early Show
Groveton was featured on The Early Show on January 5, 2012. It was a story on the mill and featured Karen Brown of The Early Show and Roger Caron.

Geography
Groveton is located in the northern part of the town of Northumberland in western Coos County at  (44.600868, -71.513525). It lies on the northwest side of the Upper Ammonoosuc River about a mile east of the river's mouth at the Connecticut River, which forms the New Hampshire/Vermont border.

U.S. Route 3 passes through Groveton, leading north  to Colebrook and south  to Lancaster, the Coos County seat. New Hampshire Route 110 branches east from US 3 on the south edge of Groveton and leads east then southeast  to Berlin.

Demographics

As of the census of 2010, there were 1,118 people, 491 households, and 300 families residing in the CDP. There were 550 housing units, of which 59, or 10.7%, were vacant. The racial makeup of the CDP was 98.9% white, 0.1% Native American, 0.2% Asian, and 0.8% two or more races. 0.6% of the population were Hispanic or Latino of any race.

Of the 491 households in the CDP, 29.3% had children under the age of 18 living with them, 43.6% were headed by married couples living together, 11.2% had a female householder with no husband present, and 38.9% were non-families. 31.8% of all households were made up of individuals, and 16.5% were someone living alone who was 65 years of age or older. The average household size was 2.28, and the average family size was 2.83.

22.9% of residents in the CDP were under the age of 18, 7.8% were from age 18 to 24, 23.1% were from 25 to 44, 28.2% were from 45 to 64, and 18.4% were 65 years of age or older. The median age was 41.9 years. For every 100 females, there were 93.8 males. For every 100 females age 18 and over, there were 90.3 males.

For the period 2011-15, the estimated median annual income for a household was $36,250, and the median income for a family was $51,563. Male full-time workers had a median income of $36,906 versus $26,083 for females. The per capita income for the CDP was $19,504. 9.3% of the population and 5.2% of families were below the poverty line, along with 12.8% of people under the age of 18 and 6.9% of people 65 or older.

Education
Groveton High School, located on State Street (US 3) at the north end of town, serves Groveton and the towns of Northumberland, Stark, Guildhall and Stratford.

Notable people 

 GG Allin (1956–1993), punk rock musician notorious for his live shows
 Fred N. Cummings, US congressman from Colorado

References

External links
Groveton High School

Census-designated places in Coös County, New Hampshire
Census-designated places in New Hampshire
Berlin, New Hampshire micropolitan area